Group F of the EuroBasket Women 2015 took place between 18 and 22 June 2015. The group played all of its games at Audi Aréna in Győr, Hungary.

The four best ranked teams advanced to the final round. The points against teams from the same preliminary round were taken over.

Qualified teams

Standings

All times are local (UTC+2).

18 June

Slovakia vs Serbia

Lithuania vs Russia

Croatia vs Spain

20 June

Lithuania vs Croatia

Russia vs Slovakia

Serbia vs Spain

22 June

Slovakia vs Croatia

Spain vs Russia

Serbia vs Lithuania

External links
Official website

Group E
2014–15 in Spanish women's basketball
2014–15 in Lithuanian basketball
2014–15 in Russian basketball
2014–15 in Serbian basketball
2014–15 in Slovak basketball
2014–15 in Croatian basketball